Alto Summit is an album by saxophonists Lee Konitz, Pony Poindexter, Phil Woods and Leo Wright  recorded in West Germany in 1968 and released on the MPS label. The album was released in the US on Prestige Records.

Critical reception

Scott Yanow of Allmusic said "This unusual album teams together the altos of Lee Konitz, Pony Poindexter, Phil Woods and Leo Wright (along with pianist Steve Kuhn, bassist Palle Danielsson and drummer Jon Christensen) on a variety of challenging material. There are four pieces for the full septet (including one that pays tribute to both Bach and Bird), a pair of quintet performances and a ballad medley that ends in a complete fiasco (it has to be heard to be believed). Despite the latter, everyone fares well on this summit meeting".

Track listing 
 "Native Land" (Curtis Amy) – 6:13
 "Ballad Medley: Skylark/Blue and Sentimental/Gee, Baby, Ain't I Good to You/Body and Soul" (Hoagy Carmichael, Johnny Mercer/Count Basie, Jerry Livingston, Mack David/Andy Razaf, Don Redman/Johnny Green, Edward Heyman, Robert Sour, Frank Eyton) – 11:15
 "Prompt" (Benny Bailey) – 5:40
 "The Perils of Poda" (Phil Woods) – 5:12
 "Good Booty" (Pony Poindexter) – 8:14
 "Lee O's Blues" (Leo Wright, Lee Konitz) – 4:30
 "Lee's Tribute to Bach and Bird" (Johann Sebastian Bach/Charlie Parker) – 4:20

Personnel 
Lee Konitz (tracks 1-4, 6 & 7), Pony Poindexter (tracks 1-5 & 7), Phil Woods (tracks 1-5 & 7), Leo Wright (tracks 1-4, 6 & 7) – alto saxophone
Steve Kuhn – piano
Palle Danielsson – bass 
Jon Christensen – drums

References 

Lee Konitz albums
Pony Poindexter albums
Phil Woods albums
Leo Wright albums
1968 albums
MPS Records albums
Prestige Records albums